Darbhanga is the fifth-largest city and municipal corporation in the state of Bihar in India. It is one of the most important districts and big cities of North Bihar. It serves as the headquarters of the Darbhanga district and the Darbhanga division.

Darbhanga was the seat of the erstwhile Khandwala zamidaar dynasty under the Mughals. It is the capital of the proposed Indian state, Mithila. It is considered as the Medical Capital of North Bihar. It has Darbhanga Medical College and Hospital & second AIIMS, of the state after the capital city Patna has been demanded by the current MP of Darbhanga, Gopal Jee Thakur.

Darbhanga is one of the oldest cities in India. Musical, folk art, and literary traditions in Sanskrit, Maithili and Urdu have been passed down generations in Darbhanga and constitute the city's strong cultural background. It us popularly known as the "Cultural Capital of Bihar" and the "Heart of Mithilaanchal".

History

The city was the capital of the Darbhanga Raj, an estate established in the 16th century, and contains the Anandbagh Palace. It was constituted a municipality in 1864. Darbhanga is home to the Kameshwara Singh Darbhanga Sanskrit University (1961), which is located on the grounds of the palace, and the Lalit Narayan Mithila University (1972). Darbhanga has a museum housing archaeological materials, as well as historical and handicrafts exhibits. Darbhanga has been a centre for music since the late 18th century and has produced multiple well-known dhrupad (an ancient form of Indian classical music) musicians. A major rail and road junction, Darbhanga trades in agricultural produce, mangoes, and fish. In addition to food processing, the city has a light manufacturing industry.

Darbhanga is situated on a vast alluvial plain, with low-lying areas containing marshes and lakes. Grains, oilseeds, tobacco, sugarcane, and mangoes are important crops in the region.

Under the British Raj, Darbhanga was a part of Sarkar Tirhut until 1875, when it was constituted into a separate district. Its subdivisions had been constituted earlier – Darbhanga Sadar in 1845, Madhubani in 1866, and Samastipur (then known as Tajpur) in 1867.
The city of Darbhanga is said to have been founded by one Darbhangi Khan, about whom practically nothing is known. It is also held that the name Darbhanga is derived from Dwar Banga or Dar-e-Banga, meaning the ‘door of Bengal’. This etymology does not appear to be very correct as the division between Bengal and Bihar has always been held to be further to the east. Nonetheless, the region has a linguistic and cultural affinity with Bengal.

Excavation at Balirajgarh revealed brick fortifications dating back to the 2nd century BC.

Demographics
 

The 2011 Census of India recorded Darbhanga as an Urban agglomeration with a population of 380,125 while the surrounding district has 3 million people. It is the 5th largest city in Bihar in terms of the urban population. The city has 196,573 males (52.6%) and 183,552 females (47.4%). Darbhanga has an average literacy rate of 79.40%, with male literacy at 85.08% and female literacy at 73.08%. However, as per the document published on 6 March 2021 by the office of District Magistrate Darbhanga, the urban population of Darbhanga stands 380,125

Transport

Railways

Darbhanga Junction lies on the East Central Railway. It is connected directly to all the major cities of India. Laheriasarai Railway Station is Second Major Station of Darbhanga Junction and works as an important Railway Station for people living in south Darbhanga.

Darbhanga Airport 

Darbhanga also has its own commercial airport which is connected with all the major cities of India.

The civil enclave is operated by the Airports Authority of India (AAI). The foundation stone for the project was laid by Chief Minister Nitish Kumar and then Civil Aviation Minister Suresh Prabhu in the presence of state Civil Aviation Minister Jayant Sinha on 24 December 2018. Commercial flights started on 8 November 2020.

Roadways

Darbhanga is also connected to Samastipur, Madhubani and Sitamarhi.

The East-West Corridor expressway, which connects Porbandar in Gujarat to Silchar in Assam, passes through Darbhanga.

The Amas–Darbhanga Expressway is an approved 4/6-lane wide access-controlled expressway in India. Once completed, it will be the first expressway in the state of Bihar.  connects Amas village in Gaya district to Bela Nawada village in Darbhanga district.

Geography
Darbhanga is located in the northern part of Bihar.
It lies between 25.53 degrees - 26.27 degrees N and 85.45 degrees - 86.25 degrees E at an average elevation of 171 feet (52 m). Darbhanga district covers an area of 2,279 sq km. Darbhanga is bounded by Madhubani district on north, by Samastipur district on south, by Saharsa district on east and by Sitamarhi district and Muzaffarpur district on west. Being located in Mithilanchal, Darbhanga district has a vast fertile alluvial plain devoid of any hills. It has a gentle slope from north to south direction having depression on the center. Darbhanga experiences humid subtropical climate. This city experiences three main seasons which are winter, summer and rainy season. May is the hottest month when temperature reaches up to 43 degrees C. Darbhanga district receives average 1142.3 mm rainfall and almost 92 % of the annual rainfall is received during monsoon.

Climate

Darbhanga has a humid subtropical climate (Köppen climate classification Cwa).

Education
Notable educational institutions include:

Medical colleges

* All India Institutes of Medical Sciences (AIIMS) Darbhanga( Under Construction )
 Darbhanga Medical College and Hospital
 Mithila Minority Dental College and Hospital

University
 

* Indira Gandhi National Open University (IGNOU) Regional Centre
 Kameshwar Singh Darbhanga Sanskrit University
 Lalit Narayan Mithila University
 Maulana Azad National Urdu University

Engineering and technology colleges

* Darbhanga College of Engineering
 Women's Institute of Technology
 Government Polytechnic, Darbhanga

Colleges

 C. M. Science College, Darbhanga
 Kunwar Singh College
 Marwari College
 Millat College

Schools. 

D.A.V. Public School
Darbhanga Public School
Jawahar Navodaya Vidyalaya
Jesus & Mary Academy
Madonna English School
Rose Public School
Delhi Public School

Tourism

Darbhanga has various tourist attractions and is among the oldest cities of Bihar.
Tourist spots include:
Chandradhari Museum
Darbhanga Fort
Maharajadhiraja Lakshmishwar Singh Museum
Darbhanga Planetarium
Shyama Mai Temple
Nargona Palace
Anand Bagh Palace
Raj Darbhanga
Ahalya Sthan

Media and communications
All India Radio has a 20 kW medium-wave radio station in Darbhanga which transmits various programmes of mass interest and covers a part of North Bihar as well as the Terai of Nepal.

Doordarshan has one DD National and one DD News LPT relay transmitters.

Notable people
Kameshwar Singh, Maharaja
Lakshmeshwar Singh Maharaja
Rameshwar Singh Maharaja
Sanjay Mishra, Bollywood actor
Gopal Jee Thakur, BJP leader and Current Member of Parliament from Darbhanga.
Veena Devi, politician and member of the 17th Lok Sabha
Abdul Bari Siddiqui, MLA
Badri Narain Sinha, IPS
Bhawana Kanth, first female fighter pilot of India
Binod Bihari Verma, writer
Binodanand Jha, former MP
Gangesha Upadhyaya, mathematician and philosopher
Gonu Jha Pratyutpannamati

Dr. Ashok Kr. Yadav, MP from Madhubani Lok Sabha constituency
Gul Mohammad Khan, Bangladeshi musician
H. C. Verma, physicist
Hukmdev Narayan Yadav, former MP
Imtiaz Ali (director), Bollywood director
Kirti Azad, former MP and cricketer
M J Warsi, linguist
Nagarjun, poet, writer, essayist, and novelist
Narayan Das, politician
Nigamananda Saraswati, Hindu monk
Prabhat Jha (politician), politician
Parmanand Jha, first vice president of Nepal
Ram Chatur Mallick, musician
Ramnandan Mishra, Indian nationalist who fought for India's freedom from British rule
Sultan Ahmad, former MLA
Sanjay Saraogi, MLA
Dr. Murari Mohan Jha, MLA from Keoti Vidhan Sabha Assembly Constituency
Satya Narayan Sinha, politician
Surendra Jha 'Suman', poet, freedom fighter, politician, essayist, literary critic, journalist, publisher and academician
Jyoti Kumari, Sirhulli, cyclist and Bal Puraskar recipient 2021
Tariq-ur-Rehman, cricketer
Tochi Raina, singer, composer, and philosopher
Yamuna Karjee, Indian independence activist
Betty von Fürer-Haimendorf, ethnologist
Ritviz, electronic singer
Manas Bihari Verma, Padam Shri decorated Aeronautical scientist, LCA Tejas

See also
 Laheriasarai

References

External links

 

 
Cities and towns in Darbhanga district